Gulaga National Park is a national park on the south coast of New South Wales, Australia, about  north of Bermagui. The park is dominated by Gulaga, also known as Mount Gulaga (formerly Mount Dromedary). The former Wallaga Lake National Park, Goura Nature Reserve, and Mount Dromedary Flora Reserve were combined to form this park in 2001.

History

In 2001, as part of the Southern Comprehensive Regional Forest Agreement and at the request of Yuin people, Gulaga National Park was created out of the existing Wallaga Lake National Park, Goura Nature Reserve, and Mt Dromedary Flora Reserve.

On 6 May 2006 the freehold titles to Gulaga and Biamanga National Parks were handed back to the Yuin people, the traditional owners of the land, by the New South Wales Government, represented by  then New South Wales Environment Minister Bob Debus. Freehold title of Gulaga National Park is held in trust by land councils for the Aboriginal owners by Merrimans and Wagonga Local Aboriginal Lands Councils, while that of Biamanga will be held in trust by Merrimans and Bega Local Aboriginal Lands Councils.

Description
It forms part of the Ulladulla to Merimbula Important Bird Area, identified as such by BirdLife International because of its importance for swift parrots.

Wallaga Lake, the largest lake in southern NSW, lies within the park. 

See also
 Protected areas of New South Wales

References

External links
 (NSW National Parks and Wildlife Service)

National parks of New South Wales
South Coast (New South Wales)
Protected areas established in 2001
2001 establishments in Australia
Important Bird Areas of New South Wales
Australian Aboriginal freehold title